Peter Andreyevich Arshinov (1887–1937), was a Russian anarchist revolutionary and intellectual who chronicled the history of the Makhnovshchina.

Initially a Bolshevik, during the 1905 Revolution, he became active within the Ukrainian anarchist movement, taking part in a number of terrorist attacks against Tsarist officials. He was arrested for his activities and imprisoned in Butyrka prison, where he met Nestor Makhno.

Following the 1917 Revolution, he was released from prison and returned to Ukraine to join Makhno's partisan movement. Arshinov became a leading intellectual figure within the Makhnovist movement, as editor of its main newspaper, and chronicled the development of events as the movement's official historian.

When the movement was suppressed by the Bolsheviks, he went into exile, where he participated in the publication of the Organisational Platform and the debates surrounding it. By the 1930s, he had moved back towards Bolshevism and decided to return to the Soviet Union, where he was executed during the Great Purge.

Biography 
In 1887, Peter Andreyevich Arshinov was born into a working-class family, in a village in Penza Governorate of the Russian Empire. At the age of 17, Arshinov moved to Turkestan, where he worked as a machinist.

Early revolutionary activities
With the outbreak of the 1905 Revolution, he joined the Bolshevik faction of the Russian Social Democratic Party and edited its underground newspaper Molot. When Arshinov caught the attention of the police for his revolutionary activity, he moved to the Ukrainian city of Katerynoslav, where he split with the Bolsheviks over ideological disagreements and became a member of the anarchist movement. In December 1906, following the repression of revolutionary elements, Arshinov led the formation of an anarchist terrorist cell in Katerynoslav and organised a series of attacks, including the bombing of a police station and the assassination of a government official. 

On 7 March 1907, Arshinov publicly assassinated a railway boss in Oleksandrivsk. He was quickly arrested and sentenced to be hanged, but his sentence was commuted and he used this time to plan an escape. He broke out of prison on Easter Sunday, and fled first to France then to Austria-Hungary, where he engaged in arms trafficking and the smuggling of anarchist propaganda into the Russian Empire. In 1911, he was arrested again and extradited to Russia, where he was sentenced to 20 years in Butyrka prison.

With the Makhnovshchina
In prison, Arshinov was acquainted with the young Ukrainian anarchist Nestor Makhno, who he took under his wing as a pupil, teaching him Russian language and literature, mathematics, geography, history, economics and politics. Following the February Revolution, they were released from prison as part of a general amnesty. While Makhno returned home to Ukraine, Arshinov remained behind in Moscow and began organising with the local Anarchist Federation, spending most of his time in Moscow publishing the works of Mikhail Bakunin and Peter Kropotkin.

Following the October Revolution, he quickly became demoralised by the direction of events and lost interest in himself returning to Ukraine. As a consequence of the Treaty of Brest-Litovsk, Ukraine was invaded and occupied by the Central Powers, with support from the Ukrainian nobility. The peasants reacted by carrying out a campaign of guerrilla warfare against the occupation forces and their Ukrainian collaborators, as part of a war of independence that spread throughout the country. One of these peasant insurgent bands was led by Nestor Makhno, who defeated the occupation forces at the battle of Dibrivka and captured much of his home region, becoming the leader of a mass movement of the Ukrainian peasantry which declared him their Bat'ko.

In the wake of the anarchist victory, Arshinov joined a number of other Russian anarchist intellectuals in emigrating to Ukraine, where they established the Nabat, a confederation of anarchist organisations. In April 1919, Arshinov arrived in Huliaipole, where he was reunited with Makhno and joined his movement, becoming a leading ideologue within the Cultural-Educational Department. The following month, Arshinov began editing the movement's newspaper The Road to Freedom,  which published 50 issues in the Katerynoslav region until November 1920. During this period, Arshinov observed the nascent Makhnovist movement establishing agricultural communes, organised according to the communist principle of "from each according to their ability, to each according to their needs". 

The anarchist region soon came under attack by the White movement, which forced them to negotiate an alliance with the Red Army, which had also invaded Ukraine. While on their way to meet the Bolshevik delegate Lev Kamenev in Huliaipole, Arshinov witnessed Makhno execute one of his own followers for antisemitism. He then observed Makhno and Kamenev's meeting, which initially seemed amicable, but which Arshinov later came to question the intent of. By May 1919, relations between the Bolsheviks and anarchists had become strained by political divisions and by the collapse of the Donbas front, which Arshinov blamed on Red Army commanders, who he claimed had deliberately deprived the insurgents of weaponry. Makhno soon resigned his command and, now under attack by both the Reds and the Whites, resolved to retreat into the west. 

Arshinov joined the Makhnovists in their westward retreat, during which he witnessed large numbers of people joining the newly constituted Insurgent Army, was present for the assassination of Nykyfor Hryhoriv, and at the battle of Peregonovka. There the Insurgent Army defeated the Volunteer Army and subsequently captured most of southern Ukraine, to which Arshinov himself attributed the defeat of the entire White movement. Arshinov then observed what he considered to be a failure to establish either political or military control over left-bank Ukraine, which he blamed on the outbreak of epidemic typhus within the ranks of the Makhnovshchina. The Red Army took the opportunity to attack the Makhnovshchina, which Arshinov estimated to have eventually resulted in the execution of almost 200,000 Ukrainian peasants by the Bolsheviks.

After months of fighting between the Makhnovists and Bolsheviks, a White offensive into Taurida forced them into an agreement, which brought about the brief cessation of hostilities between the two factions. Arshinov himself justified the pact as a way of bringing them closer together with the mass base that the Bolsheviks had in the proletariat. But following their combined victory over the Whites in the siege of Perekop, Arshinov witnessed the subsequent Bolshevik offensive against the Makhnovshchina on 26 November, in what Arshinov insisted to have been a premeditated attack.

He then witnessed the subsequent period of guerrilla warfare against the Red Army, documenting their pursuit across the country. Despite the danger, Arshinov remained with Makhno until the spring of 1921, when he and his wife clandestinely crossed the border into Poland and then went on to Germany.

Exile
In 1922, Arshinov arrived in Berlin, where he completed his History of the Makhnovist Movement. He then moved on to Paris in 1925, where he established the anarchist journal Delo Truda. Meanwhile, he earned a living by making handmade shoes, as part of a scheme for Russian refugees, which lasted until competition from a French industrial manufacturer made it no longer profitable.

On 20 June 1926, Arshinov participated in the publication of the Organisational Platform of the General Union of Anarchists, which lay out a framework for how anarcho-communists could politically organise, through theoretical and tactical unity, collective responsibility and federalism. This caused an immediate controversy within the anarchist movement, with Arshinov being accused of Bolshevism by anarchists such as Alexander Berkman and Volin, the latter of whom claimed Arshinov intended to establish an anarchist political party along bureaucratic and centralist lines.

By 1931, Arshinov had broken with the anarchist movement and began openly expressing support for the Soviet government of Joseph Stalin. By this time, Arshinov's wife grown weary of life in exile and wanted their family to return to Russia, which the Bolshevik politician Sergo Ordzhonikidze offered to sponsor. Despite warnings by Volin, who predicted that he would be executed for his anarchist past, in 1934, Arshinov finally returned to the Soviet Union, where he found work as a proofreader. Only three years later, Arshinov was arrested and shot during the Great Purge, on charges of having allegedly propagandised for anarchism upon his return to Russia.

Works 
 History of the Makhnovist Movement (1921)
 The Two Octobers (1927)
 Reply to Anarchism's Confusionists (1927)
 The Old and New in Anarchism (1928)
 Elements Old and New in Anarchism (1928) 
 Anarchism and the Dictatorship of the Proletariat (1931)
 Anarchism in our age (1933)

References

Bibliography

External links 
 
 

1887 births
1937 deaths
Historians from the Russian Empire
Journalists from the Russian Empire

Anarcho-communists
Communists from the Russian Empire
Communist Party of the Soviet Union members
Editors from the Russian Empire
Emigrants from the Russian Empire to Austria-Hungary
Emigrants from the Russian Empire to France
Escapees from Russian detention
Executed anarchists
Great Purge victims from Russia

Immigrants to the Soviet Union
Makhnovshchina
Newspaper editors from the Russian Empire
People from Nizhnelomovsky Uyezd
People of the 1905 Russian Revolution
People of the Russian Revolution
People who emigrated to escape Bolshevism
Politicians from Dnipro
Publishers (people) from the Russian Empire
Anarchists from the Russian Empire
Russian book publishers (people)

Newspaper founders from the Russian Empire
Revolutionaries from the Russian Empire
Russian Social Democratic Labour Party members
Old Bolsheviks
Soviet anarchists
Soviet emigrants to France
Soviet male writers
Soviet newspaper editors
Russian Soviet Federative Socialist Republic people
Writers from Dnipro